"Ghost Rider" is a song by the protopunk band Suicide appearing on their debut album. The song is based on the Marvel Comics character.

Cover versions 

 1979: Danish punk band Sods (later Sort Sol), covered the song on their debut album, Minutes to Go.
 1981: Suicide's lead vocalist Alan Vega re-recorded the song for his second solo album, Collision Drive.
1983: Soft Cell (Marc Almond & Dave Ball) perform Ghost Rider live at various shows featuring guest vocalist Clint Ruin (aka JG Thirlwell, including a performance for UK television programme The Tube which also features Gary Barnacle on saxophone.
 1987: American musician Henry Rollins, formerly of the hardcore group Black Flag, recorded the song for his debut album, Hot Animal Machine.
 1987: Electronic rock group The Cassandra Complex performs Ghost Rider live and it appears on their live album Feel the Width.
 1988: Alternative rock band R.E.M. released a cover of the song on the B-side to their 1988 single "Orange Crush". It later appeared on the band's 1993 compilation album The Automatic Box.
 1990: Detroit garage rock band The Gories included the song on their second album.
 1994: Henry Rollins also re-recorded the song with the Rollins Band for the soundtrack to the film The Crow.
 2008: Industrial rock band The Young Gods did a cover version of the song on their album Knock on Wood.
 2010: British rapper M.I.A. sampled the song on "Born Free".
 2010: Gavin Friday and David Ball covered the song for the Alan Vega 70th Birthday Limited Edition EP Series
 2014: British musician Anna Calvi covered the song on her Strange Weather EP.
 2018: The American two piece Rock band Big Business (band) recorded the song for their Tour E.P. 4
 2019: Japanese alternative rock band The Novembers covered the song, releasing it as both a single, and a track on their album ANGELS.
 2022: Andy McCoy plays a loose version of the song live on tour as an interlude to his version of Hanoi Rocks song "Taxi Driver". According to YouTuber Joe Smith the performance of the song is "Andy's comment on US school shootings".

Accolades 

(*) designates unordered lists.

Personnel
Adapted from the Suicide liner notes.

Suicide
 Martin Rev – keyboards, drum programming
 Alan Vega – vocals

Production and additional personnel
 Larry Alexander – engineering
 Craig Leon – production
 Marty Thau – production

References 

1977 songs
Suicide (band) songs
Songs written by Martin Rev
Songs written by Alan Vega
Songs about fictional male characters